The 2016 Illinois State Redbirds football team represented Illinois State University as a member of the Missouri Valley Football Conference (MVFC) during the 2016 NCAA Division I FCS football season. Led by eighth-year head coach Brock Spack, the Redbirds compiled an overall record of 6–6 with a mark of 4–4 in conference play, tying for fourth place the MVFC. For the third straight season, Illinois State received an at-large bid to the NCAA Division I Football Championship playoffs, where the Redbirds lost in the first round to Central Arkansas. The team played home games at Hancock Stadium in Normal, Illinois.

Schedule

Game summaries

Valparaiso

@ Northwestern

The Redbirds beat the Wildcats 9–7.  The win came on an Illinois State field goal as time expired.  This was ISU's first-ever victory over a Big Ten team.

Eastern Illinois

@ Indiana State

@ North Dakota State

Youngstown State

Southern Illinois

@ South Dakota

South Dakota State

@ Western Illinois

Missouri State

Central Arkansas—NCAA Division I First Round

Ranking movements

References

Illinois State
Illinois State Redbirds football seasons
Illinois State
Illinois State Redbirds football